Waterloo is an inner southern suburb of Sydney, New South Wales, Australia. Waterloo is located 3 kilometres (1.9 mi) south of the Sydney central business district and is part of the local government area of the City of Sydney. Waterloo is surrounded by the suburbs of Redfern and Darlington to the north, Eveleigh and Alexandria to the west, Rosebery to the south, and Moore Park, Zetland, and Kensington to the east.

History
Waterloo took its name from the Battle of Waterloo in 1815, when Allied and Prussian forces under the Duke of Wellington and Blücher defeated the French forces under Napoleon Bonaparte.

In the 1820s Waterloo began supporting industrial operations including the Fisher and Duncan Paper Mill and the Waterloo Flour Mills owned by William Hutchinson and Daniel Cooper. William Hutchinson, superintendent of convicts and public works, had been granted  of land in 1823. He sold Waterloo Farm to Daniel Cooper (1785–1853) and Solomon Levey (1794–1833). Cooper later bought out Levey's share and on his death the Waterloo Estate passed onto his nephew, also named Daniel Cooper, who was the first speaker of the New South Wales Legislative Assembly.

In 1974, the Builders Labourers Federation placed a green ban against the construction of demolition of low-income housing to make way for new apartments.

Location

Waterloo is historically a working-class region. Since early 2000s, the region has undergone some degree of gentrification with a rising business district focusing on technology-oriented firms and the development of more green space such as parks. By 2006, median individual income in Waterloo was slightly higher than the Australian average.

Nevertheless, the suburb maintains a large housing commission estate shared with Redfern with around 4,000 tenants.   The Waterloo estate is set for a facelift, with the older flats/tower blocks getting redeveloped into large luxury apartment blocks mixing social housing with affordable housing alongside the new Waterloo Metro station being developed nearby.

Waterloo is also a popular suburb to live for Sydney's large gay and lesbian population due to its closeness to nearby suburbs of Surry Hills and Darlinghurst.

The Waterloo Urban Conservation Area is a residential area of predominantly 19th-century terrace and cottage housing. New development and redevelopment in this area is encouraged to be sympathetic to the existing heritage style.

Green Square is a district in the south and east of the suburb including the suburbs of Waterloo and Zetland that is being redeveloped. It involves an urban renewal program which has seen many industrial buildings redeveloped or replaced by new residential and commercial developments. The area adjacent to South Dowling Street contains many high-rise apartment buildings with retail space at ground level.

In January 2019, the government released a redevelopment masterplan of the Waterloo social housing estate. The Government's plan outlines a 20-year vision for the area, which is about 4 kilometres from the Sydney CBD. It will include building 6,800 new homes and will comprise 6 high-rise buildings of 33 to 40 storeys.

Transport
Waterloo is serviced by Transdev John Holland routes to the Sydney CBD. Green Square station, on the Airport line of the Sydney Trains network, is located in the south-west corner of the suburb. Redfern railway station is located close to the north-west corner of the suburb.

The  to  Sydney Metro City & Southwest line is currently under construction including Waterloo station is due to open in 2024. There will also be large commercial and residential redevelopment to service the new metro.

Churches
Waterloo hosts the city campus of Hillsong Church (affiliated with the Assemblies of God). Other churches include Grace City Anglican Church, Shrine and Parish of Our Lady of Mount Carmel Catholic Church, Waterloo Congregational Church, South Sydney Uniting Church and Waterloo Salvation Army.

Demographics

Aboriginal and Torres Strait Islander people made up 3.0% of the population 35.3% of people were born in Australia. The most common countries of birth were China 13.7%, England 4.2%, New Zealand 2.6%, South Korea 2.0% and United States of America 1.6%. 47.5% of people only spoke English at home. Other languages spoken at home included Mandarin 12.7%, Russian 3.3%, Cantonese 3.2%, Spanish 2.0% and Korean 2.0%. The largest religions were Catholicism (16.8% of the population), Anglicanism (5.5%) and Buddhism (4.5%). Furthermore, 41.6% of the population marked no religion, well above the national average. 89.7% of residences were units, well above the rest of Australia (where only 13.1% of residences were units). Furthermore, 70.8% of dwellings were rented, compared to 30.9% in Australia as a whole.

At the 2021 census, the population had increased to 16,379.

Recreation
The Waterloo Skate Park is a modern skate park and the first of its kind to copy the urban streetscape layout of popular skate spots like Martin Place and Cathedral Square in Sydney. The park is located next to Waterloo Oval and the Weave Youth Services (formerly South Sydney Youth Services) building on Elizabeth Street.

Notable people
 Samuel George Ball, rugby league administrator
 Nellie Cameron, criminal
 Fred Chaplin, rugby league player
 Anne Clark, netball administrator and coach
 Claude Corbett, journalist
 Harold Corbett, rugby league player and soldier
 Tom Dadour, doctor and politician
 Dick Daley, rugby league player
 Jim Davis, rugby league player
 Frank Easton, cricketer
 Reta Mildred Findlay, businesswoman
 Edward Hallstrom, businessman
 Edward Hocking, politician
 Perce Horne, rugby league player
 Ernie Hucker, rugby league player
 Vince Hughes, rugby league player 
 Rangi Joass, rugby league player
 Jim Kenny, politician
 Perry Keyes, singer-songwriter
 The Kid Laroi, rapper, singer and songwriter
 George Kilham, rugby league player
 Jack Lawrence, rugby league player
 Vic Lawrence, rugby league player
 Elaine Nile, politician
 Syd Price, Australian Rules footballer
 Edward Root, rugby league player
 Alf Sadler, rugby league player
 Eric Spooner, politician
 Clarrie Stevenson, rugby league player 
 David Watson, rugby league player
 Frank Wilkins, rugby league player
 Ern Wilmot, rugby league player

References

External links

 Local Residents Group
 Local Community Centre
 Waterloo Guide - Sydney.com

 
Suburbs of Sydney
Gay villages in Australia
Populated places established in 1815
Green bans